The Nilka County is a county situated within the Xinjiang Uyghur Autonomous Region and is under the administration of the Ili Kazakh Autonomous Prefecture.

Administrative division 
There are 1 town in the Nilka County, which are as follows:

Note:
There are 10 townships in Nilka County, which are as follows:

Climate

References

County-level divisions of Xinjiang
Ili Kazakh Autonomous Prefecture